Rafael Pereira dos Santos  (born 18 November 1984 in Rio do Sul) is a Brazilian football player, currently playing for Ituano.

Honours 
Ceará
Campeonato Cearense: 2017, 2018

Avaí
Campeonato Catarinense: 2021

External links
 kuniyw.com Profile 
 
 

1985 births
Living people
Brazilian footballers
Brazilian expatriate footballers
Campeonato Brasileiro Série B players
Liga I players
Expatriate footballers in Romania
Associação Chapecoense de Futebol players
Grêmio Esportivo Juventus players
Clube Atlético Metropolitano players
Botafogo de Futebol e Regatas players
CS Gaz Metan Mediaș players
Esporte Clube Juventude players
Sport Club do Recife players
Criciúma Esporte Clube players
Clube Náutico Capibaribe players
Avaí FC players
Association football defenders
Ituano FC players